Monokaryotic (adj.) is a term used to refer to multinucleate cells where all nuclei are genetically identical. In multinucleate cells, nuclei share one common cytoplasm, as is found in hyphal cells or mycelium of filamentous fungi.

See also
Dikaryon
Eukaryote
Prokaryote

Cell biology